Shannon Maree Fentiman is an Australian politician. She has been the Labor member for Waterford in the Queensland Legislative Assembly since 2015 and is the current Queensland Attorney-General and Minister for Justice, Women, and the Prevention of Domestic and Family Violence.

Fentiman holds a Bachelor of Laws (First class honours) from Queensland University of Technology and Master of Laws from the University of Melbourne.

Prior to her election to the Queensland Parliament, Fentiman worked as a solicitor for Hall Payne Lawyers. She has previously worked as an industrial advocate for the Australian Manufacturing Workers Union and as a judge's associate in the Supreme Court of Queensland to Justice Atkinson.
 
Fentiman has also been a board member of the Logan Women's Health and Wellbeing Centre, Secretary of the Centre Against Sexual Violence in Logan and the Duty Solicitor at the Beenleigh Neighbourhood Centre.

Political career
Fentiman stood for Waterford in 2015 after the previous Labor Member Evan Moorhead lost the seat in the 2012 LNP landslide. Waterford was Campbell Newman Government's third most marginal seat held seat by Mike Latter. Fentiman achieved a 14.3% swing towards her, making Waterford once more a safe Labor seat. Fentiman became a first term minister and was sworn in as Minister for Communities, Women and Youth, Minister for Child Safety and Minister for Multicultural Affairs in the Palaszczuk Ministry on 16 February 2015.

After the Palaszczuk Government was re-elected on 25 November 2017, Fentiman was elevated to be the Minister for Employment and Small Business and Minister for Training and Skills Development. She is also the Ministerial Champion for the Torres Strait.

Child safety
In September 2016, the State Opposition called for Fentiman's sacking as a Minister following a number of deaths of children in foster care or within the child safety system. Two months later, an independent review found misconduct and catastrophic failures by her department in relation to the deaths of seven children.  In response, Fentiman said she still had confidence in her department’s executive staff. Some two weeks later, it was revealed that three child protection staff had been stood down, and a further nine were subject to disciplinary proceedings following the death of 21 month old Mason Jet Lee in June 2016. The child died with injuries from head to toe after being released from hospital just three months earlier.

In 2016 Fentiman announced "zero tolerance" drug testing for parents "where there is any suspicion of drug use", with particular reference to amphetamines. Fentiman stated that parents would be required to consent to an Intervention with Parental Agreement before undergoing testing.

In 2017 Fentiman announced the hiring an additional 300 Child Safety Staff members to address understaffing issues. At the time, Queensland had the highest rate of child deaths of any state in Australia, and was exceeded only by the Northern Territory.

LGBTIQ rights
Fentiman as the Child Safety Minister paved the way in Queensland to allow same sex couples to adopt children  with legislation passing the Queensland Parliament on 3 November 2016, with both the Liberal National Party and Katter Australia Party opposing the legislation. LNP spokesperson Ros Bates said that there was no need for the bill.

She also supported the successful "Yes" campaign to achieve Marriage Equality in 2017.

Free TAFE
Fentiman as Minister for Training and Skills Development introduced free TAFE for school leavers in 2018 and subsequently the free apprenticeship program in 2019 to allow young people access training in key priority areas.

Meriba Omasker Kaziw Kazipa Act 2020
In 2017 Fentiman and the then-candidate for Cook Cynthia Lui announced an election commitment to new laws to recognise Torres Strait Island families' use of traditional adoption. For generations, Torres Strait Islanders have supported their children and each other with traditional parenting approaches known more recently as "Kupai omasker". Under the practice, children can be given to other members of the community for a range of reasons, including the maintenance of family inheritance rights, provide an infertile couple with the opportunity to raise a child, strengthen alliances or distribute children of different sexes more fairly. Their guardianship can be transferred to other members of the community, typically extended family.

There had been a problem in Queensland law, where such adoptions were not legally recognised by the state's Succession Act 1981, with one issue being that adopted children are not able to take on the surname of their adoptive parents. On 17 July 2020 the Queensland Government introduced a bill in parliament to legally recognise the practice. The bill was passed as the Meriba Omasker Kaziw Kazipa Act 2020 ("For Our Children's Children") on 8 September 2020.

References

Year of birth missing (living people)
Living people
Members of the Queensland Legislative Assembly
Australian Labor Party members of the Parliament of Queensland
Labor Left politicians
Australian solicitors
University of Melbourne alumni
Queensland University of Technology alumni
21st-century Australian politicians
Women members of the Queensland Legislative Assembly
21st-century Australian women politicians